Canadian Accredited Independent Schools (CAIS) is a national organization for independent schools in Canada. The current Executive Director is Patti MacDonald.

History

Canadian Association of Independent Schools
The Canadian Association of Independent Schools (also known as CAIS) was established in 1981 as a national network for member schools supporting collaborative initiatives in leadership, education, management and governance. Its key activities included organizing, co-ordinating, and facilitating conferences, benchmarking, senior management compensation surveys, and advocacy.

Canadian Educational Standards Institute
In parallel, the Canadian Educational Standards Institute (CESI) was established in 1986 as an organization to develop and promote educational excellence and school improvement in independent schools. Its key activities were to establish national Standards/Best Practices and accreditation process, conducting 10 accreditation visits per year, and research and targeted Professional Development.

New organization
In October 2009, a vote was held at a combined Annual General Meeting for CAIS and CESI to create a new national organization. After extensive consultation with the membership, a new organization was formed and named Standards in Excellence and Learning (SEAL Canada). However, in February 2011, the organization changed its name to Canadian Accredited Independent Schools (CAIS).

CAIS Accredited Schools
CAIS encompasses 93 accredited independent schools, and its aim is to collaborate in the pursuit of exemplary leadership training, research and international standards of educational excellence. The stated vision of the organization is to be "Leaders in education, shaping the future of a courageous, compassionate world." According to the CAIS website, there are two CAIS-accredited schools in Bermuda and one in Switzerland.

References

External links

School accreditors
Educational organizations based in Canada